The Pathet Lao, officially the Lao People's Liberation Army, was a communist political movement and organization in Laos, formed in the mid-20th century. The group was ultimately successful in assuming political power in 1975, after the Laotian Civil War. The Pathet Lao were always closely associated with Vietnamese communists. During the civil war, it was effectively organized, equipped and even led by the People's Army of Vietnam (PAVN). They fought against the anti-communist forces in the Vietnam War. Eventually, the term became the generic name for Laotian communists.

The most important source of military aid to the movement (as was also the case for the Vietnamese communists) was China; under orders from Mao Zedong, the People's Liberation Army provided 115,000 guns, 920,000 grenades and 170 million bullets, and trained more than 700 of its military officers.

Organization 
The political movement of the Pathet Lao was called first the "Lao People's Party" (1955–1972) and later the "Lao People's Revolutionary Party" (1972–present).

Key Pathet Lao leaders include Prince Souphanouvong, Kaysone Phomvihane, Phoumi Vongvichit, Nouhak Phoumsavanh and Khamtay Siphandone.

The political wing of the Pathet Lao, called the "Lao Patriotic Front" served in multiple coalition governments, starting in 1956. Through the 1960s and 1970s the Pathet Lao battled the Royal Lao government during the Laotian Civil War, gaining control of the north and east of Laos. The Pathet Lao gained power throughout the country by the spring of 1975. In December, the US-backed Vientiane government fell and the Lao People's Revolutionary Party formed a new government.

History

1940s and 1950s 

The organization can trace its roots from the Second World War, similar to the Khmer Issarak in Cambodia and the Viet Minh in Vietnam. Originally the Lao Issara, an anti-French, non-communist nationalist movement formed on 12 October 1945, it was renamed the "Pathet Lao" in 1950 when it was adopted by Lao forces under Souphanouvong, who joined the Viet Minh's revolt against colonial French authorities in Indochina during the First Indochina War.

Souphanouvong, who had spent seven years in Nha Trang during his sixteen years in Vietnam, met Ho Chi Minh, married a Vietnamese woman while in Vietnam, and solicited Viet Minh aid in founding a guerrilla force.

In August 1950, Souphanouvong joined the Viet Minh in their headquarters north of Hanoi, and became the head of the Pathet Lao, along with its political arm dubbed "Neo Lao Issara" (Free Lao Front). The Pathet Lao founded resistance government with members: Souphanouvong (Prime Minister, Minister of Foreign Affairs), Kaysone Phomvihane (Minister of Defence), Nouhak Phoumsavanh (Minister of Finance), Phoumi Vongvichit (Deputy Prime Minister, Minister of the Interior), Souk Vongsak, Sithon Kommadam, and Phaydang Lobliayao. This was an attempt to give a false front of authority to the Lao communist movement by claiming to represent a united non-partisan effort. Two of its most important founders were members of the Indochinese Communist Party, which advocated an overthrow of the monarchy as well as expulsion of the French.

In 1953, Pathet Lao fighters accompanied an invasion of Laos from Vietnam led by Viet Minh forces; they established a government at Viengxay in Houaphanh province, northeast Laos. The communists began to make incursions into central Laos with the support of the Viet Minh, and a civil war erupted; the Pathet Lao quickly occupied substantial sections of the country.

The 1954 Geneva Conference agreements required the withdrawal of foreign forces, and allowed the Pathet Lao to establish itself as a regime in Laos's two northern provinces. The Viet Minh and North Vietnamese, in spite of the agreement, never really withdrew from the border areas of Laos and the Pathet Lao continued to operate almost as a branch organization of the Viet Minh. Two months after the conference, the North Vietnamese formed Group 100 with headquarters at Na Mèo. The unit effectively controlled and directed the Pathet Lao movement.

It was formed into an official party, the Lao Patriotic Front (Neo Lao Hak Sat (NLHS)), in 1956. Its stated goal was to wage the communist struggle against capitalism, as well as Western colonialism and imperialism. Unstated was its subordination to the Communist Party of Vietnam.

A coalition government was established in 1957 between the monarchists and communists. In May 1959 two Pathet Lao battalions which had been selected for integration into the Royal Lao Army (RLA) were surrounded by RLA troops who attempted to disarm them, part of one battalion was captured but the remainder fled to North Vietnam. Then in July 1959 Lao police arrested 16 Neo Lao Hak Sat members, including seven who had been elected to the National Assembly, on charges of treason. These actions brought about a resumption of fighting.

1959 to 1975

In late 1959, North Vietnam had reoccupied areas of eastern Laos. The area was used as a transit route for men and supplies destined for the Viet Cong insurgency in South Vietnam which became known as the Ho Chi Minh Trail. In September 1959, North Vietnam formed Group 959 in Laos with the aim of securing the supply route to South Vietnam and building the Pathet Lao into a stronger counterforce against the Lao Royal government. Group 959 openly supplied, trained and militarily supported the Pathet Lao. The typical strategy during this era was for PAVN regulars to attack first but then send in the Pathet Lao at the end of the battle to claim victory.

In the early 1960s, more attempts at neutrality agreements and coalition government were attempted, principally the International Agreement on the Neutrality of Laos signed in Geneva on 23 July 1962, but as North Vietnam had no intention of withdrawing from Laos, these agreements all failed. The Pathet Lao entered into another coalition government in June 1962 but by April 1963 the Pathet Lao abandoned the coalition and resumed fighting.

By the mid-1960s, the country had fallen into proxy warfare between pro-US and pro-North Vietnamese irregular military groups. The PAVN/Pathet Lao battled the RLA, US irregular forces (including Air America and other contract employees and Hmong commandos) and Thai volunteer forces in Laos winning effective control in the north and east. The government itself was effectively powerless. Until 1968 military operations were conducted by small units, usually of company or at most Battalion size. Typically the RLA would be dominant in the wet season from May through October when the PAVN/Pathet Lao were immobilized by the rains and the PAVN/Pathet Lao would dominate during the dry season from November through April. PAVN forces in Laos were primarily focused on supporting and defending the Ho Chi Minh Trail, with support for the Pathet Lao revolution as a secondary role. In 1968 of the estimated 40,000 PAVN troops in Laos, 25,000 were engaged in supporting the Trail, 700 as advisers to the Pathet Lao and the remainder in mobile units supporting Pathet Lao operations. Publicly the North Vietnamese maintained that they did not have any troops in Laos and were respecting the Geneva Agreement, while the United States and its allies were violating it; the United States asserted the exact opposite.

The Pathet Lao supreme headquarters or center was located in the Viengxay caves near Xam Neua manned by approximately 500 personnel. NLHS membership was estimated as being 11,000 in 1965 and 14,000 in 1978.

In October 1965 the armed forces were renamed the Lao People's Liberation Army (LPLA). LPLA estimated strength was 25,000 in June 1965, 33,000 in April 1967, 48,000+ in 1970 and 35,000 in late 1972. The LPLA was divided into regular, regional/popular and militia/guerilla forces. LPLA forces had PAVN advisers assigned to them but were not mixed with PAVN forces. Recruitment into the LPLA was based on appeals to the patriotism of young Laotians who were told that their country was rich in natural resources but the people were poor because of capitalism and US imperialism. If volunteers were not forthcoming then youth would be drafted, with the draft age of 15, but in many cases conscripts were as young as 12. Training was rudimentary with a greater emphasis placed on political indoctrination than on military skills as the "fighting will" was deemed to be the most important source of military strength. Military units had Political commissars down to company level. The LPLA were entirely dependent on the PAVN for the supply of weapons and munitions and were generally outgunned by the RLA.

In May 1968, the PAVN launched a multi-division invasion of Laos. The Pathet Lao effectively served as an auxiliary force to the PAVN. In June 1969 the PAVN/Pathet Lao launched Campaign Toan Thang, their first wet season offensive. Unable to match the heavy Soviet and Chinese weapons in addition to the numerical strength of the PAVN/Pathet Lao forces, the RLA took heavy losses. In September 1969 the RLA attacked PAVN/Pathet Lao positions on the Plain of Jars and along the Ho Chi Minh Trail, while initially successful the RLA forces were pushed back by the PAVN/Pathet Lao Campaign 139.

On 2 February 1971 the PAVN/Pathet Lao launched Campaign 74B temporarily capturing the Plain of Jars and shelling Long Tieng, the base of Vang Pao's RLA aligned army before withdrawing. On 28 October 1972 the PAVN/Pathet Lao launched Campaign 972 scoring a series of victories over the war-weary RLA forces.

With the signing of the Paris Peace Accords on 27 January 1973 all U.S. prisoners were to be released under Operation Homecoming. The United States Department of Defense (DOD) listed 311 Americans as missing in Laos, however on 1 February 1973 the North Vietnamese handed the Americans a list of prisoners of war in Laos which included only nine Americans: seven servicemen and two civilians. U.S. agencies believe that as many as 41 Americans may have been held prisoner by the Pathet Lao. Charles Shelton who was captured on 29 April 1965 was listed as a prisoner by the DOD until September 1994. As at 26 July 2019 the DOD's Defense POW/MIA Accounting Agency listed 286 Americans as missing in Laos of which 263 were classified as further pursuit, 12 deferred and 11 non-recoverable.

Shortly after the Paris Peace Accords ended U.S. involvement in the Vietnam War, the Pathet Lao and the government of Laos signed a cease-fire agreement, the Vientiane Treaty, on 21 February 1973.

On 4 April 1974 the Provisional Government of National Union (PGNU) was formed in Laos.

In December 1974, the Pathet Lao were responsible for the killing of Charles Dean and Neil Sharman, backpackers who were captured near Vientiane.

The peace envisaged by the treaty lasted only two years. The Pathet Lao refused to disarm and the PAVN did not leave the country. In late February 1975, the Pathet Lao with PAVN assistance, began attacking government strongholds on the Plain of Jars. With the fall of the Cambodian government to the Khmer Rouge on 17 April and the fall of the South Vietnamese government to the PAVN on 30 April 1975 the non-communist elements of the national government decided that allowing the Pathet Lao to enter power would be better than to have them take it by force. Long Tieng was evacuated in mid-May. On 23 August 1975, Pathet Lao forces quietly entered the capital Vientiane.

On 2 December 1975, the Pathet Lao firmly took over the government, abolishing the monarchy and establishing the Lao People's Democratic Republic. Shortly thereafter, the Pathet Lao signed an agreement with Vietnam that allowed Vietnam to station part of its army in the country and to send political and economic advisors into Laos. Vietnam afterward forced Laos to cut any remaining economic ties to its other neighbours, including Thailand and Cambodia.

After the Pathet Lao took over the country in 1975, the conflict continued in isolated pockets. In 1977, a communist newspaper promised the party would hunt down the "American collaborators" and their families "to the last root". With the demise of the Soviet Union, control of Laos by Vietnam waned at the end of the 1980s. Today, "Pathet Lao" is often invoked as a general term signifying Lao nationalism.

See also

Indochina
Laotian Civil War (the Secret War)
Vietnam War
Lao People's Revolutionary Party

References

Further reading

External links
https://web.archive.org/web/20120204034101/http://www.onwar.com/aced/data/lima/laos1962.htm
https://web.archive.org/web/20120204034105/http://www.onwar.com/aced/data/lima/laos1954.htm
http://www.factmonster.com/ce6/world/A0859186.html
http://countrystudies.us/laos/
http://countrystudies.us/laos/14.htm
http://www.britannica.com/eb/article-9058717/Pathet-Lao

Communism in Laos
Defunct communist militant groups
Factions of the First Indochina War
Factions of the Vietnam War
History of Laos
Guerrilla organizations
Laotian Civil War
Paramilitary organizations based in Laos